The 2007–08 season was Chamois Niortais' second consecutive season in Ligue 2 after their 16th-place finish in the previous campaign. With the team struggling in the league, manager Jacky Bonnevay was sacked in January 2008 and replaced by Samuel Michel. However, the new coach could not prevent Niort's relegation to the Championnat National; the team was relegated after losing their final match of the season to a goal in the fourth minute of injury time from Boulogne defender Damien Perrinelle.

A total of 27 different players were used by Niort during the 2007–08, with the trio of Stéphane Morisot, Romain Ferrier and Jacques-Désiré Périatambée each making more than 40 appearances. Benoît Leroy was the top league scorer with 7 goals, while Jean-François Rivière was the highest goalscorer overall, netting a total of 14 in all competitions. Niort fared better in cup competitions than in the league, reaching the last 32 of the Coupe de France and the last 16 of the Coupe de la Ligue for the first time in seven seasons.

Appearances and goals

Ligue 2

League table

Matches

Coupe de France

Coupe de la Ligue

References

Chamois Niortais F.C. seasons
Chamois Niortais